Malaysia participated in the 2010 Asian Para Games–First Asian Para Games in Guangzhou, China from 13 to 19 December 2010. Athletes from Malaysia won total 45 medals (including nine gold), and finished at the sixth spot. The country participated in 15 sports out of 19 sports contested in the event.

Medalists

See also
 Malaysia at the 2010 Asian Games

References

Nations at the 2010 Asian Para Games
2010 in Malaysian sport
Malaysia at the Asian Para Games